Loga Park (Russian: Парк Логá) is a European-style landscape park situated in Khutor Staraya Stanitsa of Kamensk-Shakhtinsky City in the Rostov region of Russia. Its name came from the Logo beam in which floodplain it is situated.

History 
The Loga Park was created by local businessman Sergey A. Kushnarenko, the owner of paints, varnishes and lacquers group  Престиж холдинг in a droughty region in a former dump site and opened in 2012.

Landscape design 
The park is an example of modern garden art and received a local unofficial name Little Switzerland for its picturesque view. Originally the Loga Park occupied an area of 16 hectares, and was subsequently expanded to 22 hectares.

There is a false mirror gallery, a 7D cinematograph, a musical fountain, a garden of stones, a water mill, a river, bridges and gazebos, over a hundred sculptures, several ponds with turtles, golden fish and swans, waterfalls, small zoo with  deer, squirrels, raccoons, peacocks and many other kinds of birds and animals.

In 2015, a new Orthodox church of St. Sergius of Radonezh was erected on the territory of the park. There is a restaurant Teterev, and a snack-bar Lukomoriye, where Russian and European cuisine are served in the  interior of the Russian mansion.

Admission and opening times 
Admission is free. The park is open 24 hours. There is car parking.

Present day 
Every day the staff of 40 people including professional landscape designers work in the park. The Loga Park has an operating cost of about 1 million rubles a month. Further expansion of the territory is planned as well as construction of an aqua park and a hotel.

In 2016, the park was visited by the governor of the Rostov region Vasily Golubev, who promised to support the park and build a separate road to it from the highway M-4 Don. The entry is from the Don highway through the junction following signpost to the Old Stanitsa.

References

External links 
 Logapark.ru
 Loga.ru
 http://worldroads.ru/park-loga-samyiy-krasivyiy-na-donu
  На Старую Станицу свалился кусочек Швейцарии
 Wikimapia парк «Лога́»
 Губернатор пообещал дорогу к парку “Лога”

Parks in Russia
2012 establishments in Russia
Protected areas established in 2012
Tourist attractions in Rostov Oblast